The 2001 Atlantic 10 Conference Baseball Championship was held at Cracker Jack Stadium in Kissimmee, Florida, from May 17 through 19. It featured the top four regular-season finishers of the conference's 11 teams. 2001 was the final season that the tournament had four teams; in 2002, it moved to a six-team format. Third-seeded Richmond defeated George Washington in the title game to win the tournament for the third time, earning the Atlantic 10's automatic bid to the 2001 NCAA Tournament.

Seeding 
The league's top four teams, based on winning percentage in the 22-game regular-season schedule, were seeded one through four. In the tie for third place, the conference's tiebreakers gave Dayton the second seed over Temple.

Bracket

All-Tournament Team 
The following players were named to the All-Tournament Team. Temple third baseman Kyle Sweppenhiser, one of five Owls selected, was named Most Outstanding Player.

This was the second time Sweppenhiser was selected to the time, after having first been selected in 1999 George Washington's Mike Bassett and Dan Rouhier were both named for the second time. Bassett was first selected in 2000, Rouhier in 1998.

References 

Tournament
Atlantic 10 Conference Baseball Tournament
Atlantic 10 Conference baseball tournament
Atlantic 10 Conference baseball tournament
College baseball tournaments in Florida
Sports in Kissimmee, Florida
Tourist attractions in Osceola County, Florida
Events in Kissimmee, Florida